Southport is a mixed-use development in Renton, Washington, United States. It is located on the southern shore of Lake Washington adjacent to the Renton Landing lifestyle center and the Boeing Renton Factory.

History
Southport is a  mixed-use development that began in 1999, located on  along Lake Washington in Renton, Washington. The property was formerly the site of a Puget Sound Energy steam plant which was demolished in 2001, and construction on the residential phase of Southport began later that year. 

By 2019 the complex included a hotel and 712,752 square feet of office space. across three office buildings. The complex also includes 30,000 square feet in retail space.

Transportation
Seco plans to run ferry routes directly between Southport and other parts of the region, including South Lake Union in Seattle. The complex also includes a six-story parking garage and a private yacht dock.

References

Buildings and structures in Renton, Washington